Chernykhiv is a village in Ternopil Raion, Ternopil Oblast (province) of western Ukraine. It belongs to Ternopil urban hromada, one of the hromadas of Ukraine.

Until 18 July 2020, Chernykhiv belonged to Zboriv Raion. The raion was abolished in July 2020 as part of the administrative reform of Ukraine, which reduced the number of raions of Ternopil Oblast to three. The area of Zboriv Raion was merged into Ternopil Raion.

Population
Population in 2007: 416 inhabitants.
Population in 2014: 390 inhabitants with over 221 houses.

They were born in the village
 priest, folklorist, historian Petro Bilynskyi (b. 1846),
 writer, scientist, public figure Oleh Herman (b. 1948),
 public figure of the Ukrainian diaspora in the United States Petro Hlynskyi (b. 1917),
 poets Ivan Holub (1917–2001), Vasyl Karachok (b. 1870),
 painter, sculptor Volodymyr Kosovskyi (b. 1929),
 teacher, writer, ethnographer Yakiv Kosovskyi (1899-1975);
 architect and public and cultural figure of the Ukrainian diaspora in Australia Roman Pavlyshyn (b. 1922),
 literary critic Liubomyr Senyk (b. 1930),
 public and political figure, teacher Bohdan Tymochko (b. 1926),
 scientist in the field of physics and mathematics, teacher, public figure Oleh Shabliy (b. 1935).

References

Notes

Sources

External links

Ternopil urban hromada
Villages in Ternopil Raion